The following is a list of characters from the wuxia novel Datang Youxia Zhuan by Liang Yusheng.

Main characters 
 Tie Mole is Tie Kunlun's son and Dou Lingkan's godson. He joins Han Zhifen and Han Zhan in helping Xin Tianxiong and his volunteer army fight the rebels.
 Nan Jiyun, nicknamed "Nan Ba", is a famous martial artist from Weizhou. He dies in the Battle of Suiyang.
 Xia Lingshuang is Leng Xuemei's daughter. Her biological father is actually Huangfu Hua, but she never knew the truth because her mother refused to tell her. She is highly skilled in swordplay and appears to help the other protagonists in the nick of time when they encounter trouble. She marries Nan Jiyun and gives birth to a pair of twin boys, and is said to be pregnant with a third child near the end of the novel. After surviving the Battle of Suiyang, she dedicates the rest of her life to raising her children and Duan Keye.
 Wang Yanyu is Wang Botong's daughter. She has a crush on Tie Mole and saves him from death a few times. Tie Mole initially sees her as an enemy because she had killed his godfather. However, he is reluctant to kill her later as he gradually develops romantic feelings for her through their various encounters.
 Han Zhifen is Han Zhan's daughter who inherits her father's powerful dianxue techniques. She falls in love with Tie Mole and marries him eventually.
 Duan Guizhang is a famous swordsman from Youzhou. In his younger days, he had offended An Lushan and had been forced to go into hiding after An Lushan rose to power. By chance, he meets Tie Mole and passes his skills to him. Duan Guizhang dies in the Battle of Suiyang.
 Dou Xianniang is the younger sister of the five Dou brothers and Duan Guizhang's wife. Her prowess in martial arts complement her husband's swordsmanship. She is severely injured during the Battle of Suiyang. Before her death, she entrusts her son to Xia Lingshuang's care and tells him about his fiancée, Shi Ruomei.

Tang Empire

Imperial clan 
 Li Longji, better known as Emperor Xuanzong is the ruler of the Tang Empire. He becomes Retired Emperor after his son usurps his throne. He holds a grudge against Tie Mole because of the latter's involvement in Consort Yang's death at Mawei courier station, so he summons Tie Mole to meet him in private and pretends to offer him wine, which is spiked with poison. Tie Mole refuses to drink and escapes from Mawei after fighting his way out. The emperor denounces him a traitor and orders his arrest.
 Li Heng is the ambitious crown prince. He declares himself emperor after gaining power and becomes historically known as Emperor Suzong.
 Princess Changle is Emperor Xuanzong's daughter. She was trained in swordsmanship by Gongsun Daniang. Her father often keeps her close to his side as a bodyguard. She develops a crush on Tie Mole after he saves her and her father from assassins.

Yang Guozhong and associates 
 Yang Yuhuan, better known as Consort Yang, is Emperor Xuanzong's favourite concubine. During the incident at Mawei courier station, the discontented soldiers killed Yang Guozhong and demanded that the emperor put Consort Yang to death. Consort Yang willingly accepts her fate and commits suicide to appease the soldiers' rage.
 Yang Guozhong is Consort Yang's cousin and the chancellor of the Tang Empire. He has an ongoing feud with An Lushan and is indirectly responsible for causing An Lushan to rebel against the Tang Empire. At Mawei courier station, the soldiers blame him for their plight and the decline of the Tang Empire, and kill him.
 Yang Xuan is Yang Guozhong's son who served as the Vice Minister of Revenue. He is killed along with his father by the soldiers during the incident at Mawei courier station.
 The Lady of Han and Lady of Guo are Consort Yang's sisters. The former was killed by soldiers during the incident at Mawei courier station, while the latter was killed in a mob led by Xue Jingxian.

Officials 
 Li Linfu was Yang Guozhong's predecessor as chancellor.
 Wei Jiansu
 Wei Fangjin
 Eunuchs:
 Gao Lishi
 Li Fuguo
 Li Guinian is a minstrel favoured by Emperor Xuanzong.
 Feng Shenwei is an imperial emissary.
 Xue Jingxian is a county magistrate.
 Wei E

Governors 
 Zhang Xun is the governor of Suiyang who dies during the Battle of Suiyang against Shi Siming's forces.
 Yan Zhenqing is the governor of Pingyuan.
 Feng Changqing is appointed the military governor of Fanyang and Pinglu after An Lushan rebelled. After Feng Changqing is defeated by An Lushan, Emperor Xuanzong orders Geshu Han to execute Feng Changqing.
 Zhang Yougui was the military governor of Youzhou. An Lushan used to serve under him before rising to prominence.
 Wu Jun is a minister in Huzhou.
 Zhang Jieran is the military governor of Henan.
 Guo Ne is the governor of Chenliu who surrendered to An Lushan.
 Yang Guangfan is the governor of Taiyuan and a relative of Yang Guozhong.
 Wang Sili is the military governor of Heyuan.
 Lü Fu is the governor of Fufeng Prefecture. He volunteers to provide troops to help Emperor Xuanzong drive away the rebels from Chang'an.

Military officers 
 Guo Ziyi is the governor of Jiuyuan and one of the generals in charge of suppressing An Lushan's rebellion.
 Geshu Han is a general defending Tong Pass from An Lushan's rebel forces. He was forced by Yang Guozhong to attack the rebels and fell into an ambush, in which the majority of his forces perished. He surrenders to the rebels in desperation.
 Qin Xiang is a descendant of Qin Shubao. In battle, he uses a pair of heavy steel clubs which he inherits from his ancestor. He is one of the top three martial arts experts in the palace. On one occasion, he is ambushed by Wang Botong's men but Tie Mole saves him.
 Yuchi Bei is a descendant of Yuchi Gong and one of the top three martial arts experts in the palace. He befriends Tie Mole later.
 Yuchi Nan is Yuchi Bei's elder brother who serves as an imperial guard commander.
 Yuwen Tong is one of the top three martial arts experts in the palace who had once fought with Nan Jiyun. He is jealous of Tie Mole, who is favoured by Emperor Xuanzong after he saved the emperor from assassins. Secretly conspiring with An Lushan, he is exposed when Kongkong'er discovers evidence of his treachery and shows it to Tie Mole and Qin Xiang. He is defeated by Tie Mole in a fight and is bound and escorted back as a captive by Qin Xiang.
 Chen Yuanli is a general escorting Emperor Xuanzong from Chang'an to Sichuan.
 Cui Guangyuan is appointed as the governor of Chang'an when Emperor Xuanzong evacuated the capital.
 Helan Jinming is a grand marshal who refuses to send reinforcements to Suiyang when Nan Jiyun breaks out of the siege and comes to seek help. Nan Jiyun bites off one of his fingers in protest, but he still refuses and has Nan Jiyun detained. Duan Guizhang and the others rescue Nan Jiyun later.
 Liu Yan is Guo Ziyi's subordinate.

Guards 
 Linghu Da is a colonel of the imperial guards. When the assassins attack the emperor, he betrays the emperor and attempts to kill him, but is stopped by Tie Mole and Princess Changle. He is killed by Yuwen Tong.
 Niu Qianjin and Long Wanjun are palace guards.

An Lushan forces

An Lushan's family 
 An Lushan is a warlord who rose to prominence after winning the favour of Emperor Xuanzong and Consort Yang. He was appointed as the military governor of Fanyang and Pinglu, and later started a rebellion against the Tang Empire. He is murdered in a plot orchestrated by Madam Lu.
 An Qingxu is An Lushan's younger son and crown prince who is incompetent and weak, so his father wants to depose him. He is manipulated into murdering his father and usurping the throne.
 An Qingzong is An Lushan's eldest son who is executed by Emperor Xuanzong after his father is accused of plotting a rebellion.
 Princess Rongyi is Emperor Xuanzong's niece who married An Qingzong and was forced to commit suicide after her husband's death.
 An Qing'en is An Lushan's son and was born to Consort Duan. He is favoured by his father, who considered him a replacement for An Qingxu as crown prince.

An Lushan's followers 
 Shi Siming
 Tian Chengsi is a former bandit who serves as a general under An Lushan.
 Zhang Zhongzhi is one of An Lushan's bodyguards. He uses a pair of Tiger Head Hooks in combat.
 Asheli is a monk from the same hometown as An Lushan. He possesses immense strength. An Lushan orders him to watch over Wang Botong.
 Wu Lingxun is one of An Lushan's generals.
 Meng Guan is a former pirate who follows Yang Mulao to pursue Tie Mole but is defeated.
 Sikong Ba is a cavalry colonel under An Lushan who is killed by Tie Mole in a fight.
 Mu An is the commander of An Lushan's imperial guards.
 Hong Dacun is Nie Feng's subordinate.
 Du Shou uses an iron crutch.
 Li Zhu'er is a eunuch serving under An Lushan. He murders his master with help from An Qingxu.
 Linghu Chao is a general under Shi Siming who leads the attack on Suiyang.
 Yin Ziqi is the leader of the archer unit in Linghu Chao's army.

Xue Song and associates 
 Xue Song is a former bandit who serves as a general under An Lushan. He is forced to rebel against An Lushan just before An Qingxu seized power.
 Madam Xue is Xue Song's wife. She is captured by An Lushan's soldiers when her husband rebelled and has an ear sliced off during the struggle, but is saved by Tie Mole and his friends.
 Madam Lu is Shi Yiru's wife and Leng Xuemei's cousin. She is captured by An Lushan's men along with her husband and daughter. Xue Song is attracted by her beauty and wants to take her for himself, so she disfigures herself after her husband's death to prevent Xue Song from dishonouring her. After that, she secretly orchestrates a plot to overthrow and kill An Lushan and succeeds in doing so with help from Yan Zhuang. She was captured and held hostage by Shang Kun and attempts suicide in the same manner as her husband, but survives and dies of her wounds eventually.
 Shi Ruomei is Shi Yiru and Madam Lu's daughter who was raised as Xue Song's daughter and renamed "Hongxian". She learns swordsmanship under Abbess Miaohui's training along with Nie Yinniang.
 Nie Feng is Xue Song's cousin. Although he is on An Lushan's side, he is actually a good person. He helps Duan Guizhang and Nan Jiyun secretly before. On one occasion, he attempts to help Madam Lu escape from Xue Song's clutches. When Tie Mole is captured by Xue Song years later, he lies that Tie is a distant relative and lets Tie hide in his residence.
 Nie Yinniang is Nie Feng's daughter who is trained in swordsmanship together with Hongxian by Abbess Miaohui.
 Madam Nie is Nie Feng's wife.
 Housekeeper Hou is Nie Feng's housekeeper who forges a close friendship with Tie Mole when Tie was living in disguise in Nie's house.
 Yan Zhuang is An Qingxu's tutor. He is indirectly instigated by Madam Lu to rebel against An Lushan.
 Madam Yan is Yan Zhuang's wife and a close friend of Madam Lu and Madam Xue.
 Liu Hai is one of Xue Song's subordinates loyal to him. He provides shelter for Xue and Nie Feng's families when they are escaping from An Lushan's men.

Yang Mulao and associates 
 Yang Mulao is a martial artist nicknamed "Seven Steps Soul Chasing Hand" after his signature martial arts move. He once challenged Tie Kunlun to a martial arts contest to test his palm power. During the contest, he cheats and inflicts severe internal injuries on Tie Kunlun, causing the latter to die a few days later. Tie Mole sees him as a sworn enemy and vows to kill him to avenge his father. He is defeated and seriously wounded by the combined efforts of the protagonists during the Battle of Suiyang. His palm skills and inner energy are so powerful that he can kill an elephant with a single palm strike.
 Ma Yuanxing is slain by Nan Jiyun during the Battle of Suiyang.
 Niu Bugeng is slain by Duan Guizhang in Suiyang.
 Yang Mulao's apprentices:
 Shan Xiong follows his master to pursue Tie Mole but is injured and defeated in the fight.
 Cheng Jian
 Shang Kun holds Madam Lu hostage. Madam Lu attempts suicide so that she would not become a burden. Shang Kun is taken by surprise and slain by Tie Mole when he is distracted.
 Su Bing was a military leader in Youzhou. He bribed Yang Mulao to injure Tie Kunlun in a contest and used the opportunity to destroy Tie's bandit stronghold after Tie died from his internal injuries. The young Tie Mole was rescued and adopted by Dou Lingkan after Tie Kunlun's death. Dou Lingkan later helped Tie Mole kill Su Bing.

Wang Botong and associates 
 Wang Botong is Dou Lingkan's rival and An Lushan's secret ally. He gradually gains an edge over Dou Lingkan by recruiting several powerful martial artists to help him seize the position of chief of the wulin (martial artists' community). He is disgraced when his conspiracy with An Lushan is revealed. Yang Mulao attempts to kill him but he is saved by Bu Anqi and Abbess Miaohui. He is touched and feels guilty for his past misdeeds, so he repents and commits suicide to atone for his sins.
 Wang Longke is Wang Botong's son who is highly skilled in martial arts and uses an iron fan in combat. He was trained in martial arts by Zhuanlun Fawang, his father's friend. He lusts for Xia Lingshuang and wants to force her to marry him. During the Battle of Suiyang, he takes Yang Mulao's side and plays a role in causing Nan Jiyun's death. He is slain by Duan Keye eventually.
 Shi Yilong and Shi Yihu are two brothers nicknamed "Yin and Yang Sabers". Each of them specialises in saber techniques on one hand and they always fight together as a pair. Their personalities are also opposites of each other.
 Chu Sui is Wang Botong's sworn brother who specialises in qinna techniques.
 Tu Long uses a pair of big iron rings.
 He Kun is a colonel and archer serving under Guo Ziyi. Nan Jiyun remembers seeing him with Wang Botong once and suspects that he may harm Guo Ziyi. He is killed by Guo Congjin eventually.
 Zhu Sansheng uses a seven-section dragon whip.
 Han Jing uses a three-section staff.
 Deng She uses a thick-bladed mountain slicing saber.
 Hua Liang

Kongkong'er and associates 
 Kongkong'er is a young and arrogant martial artist of unknown origin. He specialises in the Yuan Gong Swordplay, a set of powerful sword techniques that allows the user to attack an opponent's vital points in one movement. His prowess in qinggong is also formidable, as he can travel swiftly from point to point without being detected.
 Jingjing'er is Kongkong'er's junior. He is the illegitimate son of a hunter from the Kangju tribe in the western regions, and had been abandoned as an infant and raised by tribal people. Resembling an ape in appearance, he is less powerful in swordsmanship compared to Kongkong'er. After failing to assassinate the emperor, he betrays Kongkong'er and becomes an apprentice of Zhuanlun Fawang.
 Gui Fangzhen, also known as Zanglingzi, was Kongkong'er and Jingjing'er's master.
 Madam Gui is Gui Fangzhen's wife who adopted and raised the baby Duan Keye as her apprentice and trained him in martial arts. Duan Guizhang and Dou Xianniang are grateful to her for grooming their son into a powerful martial artist.
 Duan Keye is Duan Guizhang and Dou Xianniang's son who was kidnapped by Kongkong'er while he was still an infant, and trained in martial arts by Madam Gui. He reunites with his parents eventually and they are proud to see that their son has become a powerful fighter.

Dou family 
 Dou Lingkan is an outlaw leader and the chief of the wulin (martial artists' community). He adopted Tie Mole as his godson and raised him after Tie Kunlun's death. He and his four brothers are slain by Wang Yanyu, the daughter of his rival Wang Botong.
 Dou Lingce
 Dou Lingfu
 Dou Lingshen
 Dou Lingzhan

Xin Tianxiong and associates 
 Xin Tianxiong is a bandit chief from Golden Rooster Ridge. He opposes Wang Botong after learning that the latter has a secret alliance with An Lushan. He becomes a close ally of the protagonists.
 Han Zhan is a master of dianxue techniques.
 Du Baiying is a youxia nicknamed "Golden Sword, Green Bag".
 Longzang Shangren
 The "Twin Heroes of the Sa Family"
 Fu Lingxiao is a famous youxia from southern Shaanxi.

Beggars 

 Wei Yue is nicknamed "Mad Beggar". He hates evildoers and punishes them harshly.
 Huangfu Song is nicknamed "Divine Dragon of the Western Mountain". He is reputed for performing chivalrous and heroic deeds, but is said to have also committed heinous crimes as well. (The crimes were actually committed by his brother Huangfu Hua, who resembles him in appearance.) He saves Nan Jiyun, Duan Guizhang and Tie Mole from An Lushan's men once.
 Huangfu Hua is Huangfu Song's younger brother. He was ill-behaved as a child and was influenced by the Zhan couple to do evil deeds. Resembling his brother in appearance, he often impersonates his brother and commits several atrocities. He murders Xia Shengtao and kidnaps and rapes Leng Xuemei. Eventually, he is severely injured by Duan Guizhang and Dou Xianniang, and killed by Leng Xuemei.
 Che Chi is nicknamed "Three Handed Divine Beggar" for his excellent thieving skills and "Wine Beggar" for his penchant for alcoholic drinks. He helps the protagonists fight Wang Botong's men during the first battle in Sleeping Dragon Valley. He knows the truth that Huangfu Hua, and not Huangfu Song, was the one who murdered Xia Shengtao and impregnated Leng Xuemei. However, he is killed by Huangfu Hua before he can tell Duan Guizhang.
 Wu Tieqiao is Wei Yue's junior and the chief of the beggars in Chang'an. He brings his followers with him to help Tie Mole, Duan Guizhang and the others fight An Lushan's men and save Nie Feng and Xue Song's families.

Zhan family 
 Zhan Yuanxiu is Zhan Feilong and Zhan Daniang's son and Wang Yanyu's senior. He is secretly in love with Wang Yanyu, but willingly gives up when he sees that she truly loves Tie Mole. Despite coming from a dark background, he severs ties with his family to follow the path of righteousness. He inherits his parents' skills and uses them to uphold justice.
 Zhan Feilong was a murderous villain who terrorised the jianghu several years ago until he was defeated and injured in a fight against several opponents.
 Zhan Daniang is Zhan Feilong's wife and Wang Yanyu's martial arts master. As ruthless and cruel as her husband, she went into hiding after her husband's death. She attempts to kill Tie Mole when she learns that he is competing with her son for Wang Yanyu's love, but eventually decides not to pursue her past feuds with Bu Anqi and the others after they saved her son from death.

Zhuanlun Fawang and associates 
 Zhuanlun Fawang is a monk from India who established a martial arts school based in Gold Jade Palace on Black Rock Peak. He has a past feud with Zanglingzi and lays down a rule that any intruder who enters his domain must die. Duan Guizhang, Han Zhan, Tie Mole and others are lured into his base and run into trouble with him. He is locked in a battle of inner energy against Bu Anqi and Abbess Miaohui, but the fight is stopped by Mou Canglang. His prowess in inner energy is extremely powerful, as seen from his ability to use his inner energy to levitate himself even while he remains seated on a chair.
 Zhu Ling and Zhu Bao are the sons of Zhu Xu, a bandit leader from Vermillion Bird Mountain. Their father was killed by the Dou clan and they learnt martial arts from Zhuanlun Fawang to take revenge on the Dous. They lure Duan Guizhang, Dou Xianniang and others to Gold Jade Palace.
 Reverend Tiande is Zhuanlun Fawang's most senior apprentice.

Eight Immortals of the Wine Cup 

 Li Bai
 Cui Zongzhi
 Zhang Xu
 He Zhizhang is a junior secretary.

Others 
 Shi Yiru is a jinshi who once wrote a memorial to the emperor to accuse the chancellor Li Linfu of misconduct. He felt disillusioned by corruption and nepotism in politics and declined to serve in the government, so he led a reclusive life in a village, where he met and befriended Duan Guizhang. He is captured and held hostage by An Lushan's men, who mistake him for Duan. When Duan comes to save him later, he does not want to become a burden to his friend so he commits suicide.
 Bu Anqi, better known by his pseudonym "Mirror Polishing Old Man", is Nan Jiyun and Lei Wanchun's master. Although he is a formidable martial artist, he prefers to lead an anonymous life as a mirror polisher. He accepts Tie Mole as his third apprentice through Nan Jiyun's recommendation.
 Lei Wanchun is Nan Jiyun's junior.
 Abbess Miaohui is a nun from Penglai and Zhan Daniang's senior. She trains Hongxian and Nie Yinniang in swordsmanship.
 Guo Congjin is a youxia and Du Baiying's martial arts master. He leads a reclusive life in his later life and appears to remind Emperor Xuanzong about the common people's hardships when the emperor was fleeing from Chang'an. He participates in the defence of Suiyang and sacrifices himself to severely injure Yang Mulao.
 Huairen is a monk from Chang'an and an old friend of Duan Guizhang. When Duan and Tie Mole come to Chang'an to rescue Shi Yiru, he offers them shelter in his temple.
 Xia Shengtao was a famous young youxia who was mysteriously murdered on his wedding night. Huangfu Song was accused of being the murderer. It is revealed later that the murderer was actually Huangfu Hua.
 Leng Xuemei is Xia Shengtao's wife who was kidnapped and raped by Huangfu Hua, who murdered her husband. She gave birth to Xia Lingshuang later and trained her daughter in martial arts. She kills Huangfu Hua and commits suicide after telling the truth to Duan Guizhang and a few others.
 Tie Kunlun was a bandit chief based on Mount Yan. He entrusted his young son Tie Mole to the Dou brothers before his death.
 Qiuran Ke ("Bearded Warrior") is a legendary martial artist living on an island away from the Chinese mainland.
 Yan Yiyu is Qiuran Ke's apprentice.
 Mou Canglang is one of Yan Yiyu's apprentices. He shows up to defuse the conflict between Zhuanlun Fawang, Bu Anqi and Abbess Miaohui.
 Lei Haiqing is Lei Wanchun's elder brother. He is skilled in playing the pipa and used to be a musician in Emperor Xuanzong's court. He is forced to perform in An Lushan's court later. He refuses and attempts to assassinate An Lushan but fails and dies after being seriously injured by Yang Mulao.
 Shi Zhang is a follower of the Dou brothers. He was in charge of managing the Dous' bases throughout the land.
 Cheng Tong is Shi Zhang's assistant.
 Feng Jichang was a martial artist from Fanyang and Tie Kunlun's father-in-law.
 Nie Peng was an elderly swordsman from Zhuozhou. He is believed to be Nie Feng's father.
 Gongsun Zhan is a palace guard who had a past feud with Xia Shengtao. He was one of the suspects believed to be responsible for murdering Xia Shengtao.
 Du Fu
 Taoist Guiyuan is Huangfu Hua's accomplice who is slain by Leng Xuemei.
 Reverend Zhichan is the abbot of Fulong Monastery and a close friend of Nie Feng.
 Kongxuanzi is one of the "Seven Eccentrics of the Wulin". He spreads news that Yang Mulao had died but the news turn out to be false.
 Li Tian'ao, nicknamed "Pockmarked Li", is a bandit leader from Hongzhou. He joins Shi Siming's rebel forces.

See also 
 List of organisations in wuxia fiction

References 

 

Lists of Liang Yusheng characters
Fictional Tang dynasty people